Dorrit Romanov (née Reventlow; born 22 April 1942) is a Danish translator, benefactor, philanthropist, social activist, and the widow of Prince Dimitri Romanov, who had claims to the headship of the Imperial House of Russia.

Biography

She was born Dorrit Reventlow on 22 April 1942 in the city of Recife, Brazil, in the family of Eric Reventlow (1903–1944) and his wife Nina Bent Rasmussen (1912–1996). Dorrit is the second child in the family, her brother George was born in 1941 and lived only eight years and died in 1949 in Denmark.

Dorrit's father died when she was only two years and in 1946 the family returned to Denmark. She attended private schools in Denmark and Switzerland, where she learned Portuguese, English, French, Italian and Spanish. In 1976 she opened her own translation company in Lisbon. After the death of her first husband in 1985 she returned to Denmark, where she worked as a representative of a Portuguese tourism company, also serving as the chair of a Danish-Brazilian society. In this role, Princess Dorrit succeeded in expanding the society's membership, while promoting Portuguese language and culture.

Since 1993, she has headed her own translation firm called Translator Dorrit Romanoff & Assoc. In her free time she actively helped her husband in his humanitarian and charitable work in Russia.

Marriages and children
In 1961, she married Dom Telmo José Coelho de Braganza (1925–1985), and had issue.

At a reception in 1991, Dorrit met Prince Dimitri Romanovich Romanov. On July 1993 they were married in Kostroma, which became the first visit of some Romanov spouses to Russia. Prior to her 1993 wedding, Dorrit joined the Russian Orthodox Church under the name Theodora Alexeevna.

Honours
  : Grand Officer of the Order of Merit (26 August 1992)
  : Commander of the Order of the Southern Cross (5 September 2007)

Dynastic orders
  : Grand Cross of the Order of Prince Danilo I (4 June 2005)

Ancestry

References

|-

External links
Romanov Family Association
Biography on the Danish-Brazilian society
Translator Dorrit Romanoff & Assoc 

1942 births
Living people
Grand Officers of the Order of Merit (Portugal)
House of Romanov in exile
Dorrit
Russian princesses by marriage